Steven William Sparks (born July 2, 1965) is a former knuckleball-throwing right-handed Major League Baseball pitcher, who graduated from Holland Hall School, then attended Sam Houston State University in 1987. In addition to the knuckler, Sparks threw an occasional slider and low-80s fastball.

Professional career

Milwaukee Brewers
Sparks was drafted in the 5th round by the Milwaukee Brewers. He learned to throw the knuckle ball in 1991. He bounced around in the Brewers minor league system until 1995, which was when the Brewers added him to the starting rotation to begin the season. Before the 1995 season, Sparks was infamously known for having ripped a phone book and dislocating his non throwing shoulder, having kept him from making the team in 1994.

Sparks pitched in 33 games for the Brewers in 1995, also making 27 starts. He finished 9–11 with 3 complete games.

The following season, Sparks split time between pitching with the Brewers and pitching in AAA. He pitched in 11 games at AAA, going 2–6 with a 4.99 ERA while with the Brewers he pitched in 20 games (13 starts) and recording a record of 4–7 with a 6.60 ERA. He was beset by control issues, striking out 21 and walking 52 in 88.2 innings. He also allowed 19 home runs.

Sparks underwent Tommy John surgery in 1997. After the 1997 season, Sparks was let go by the organization, ending his 10-year run with the Brewers organization.

Anaheim Angels
In 1998, Sparks signed with the Angels while he recovered from surgery. On June 16, Sparks made his return since the end of the 1996 season, pitching  en route to his first win since July 1996. For the season, Sparks finished with a 9–4 record in 22 games (20 starts). In 1999, Sparks' control issues returned, prohibiting him from gaining his effectiveness from the previous year. In 26 starts, he finished with a record of 5-11 and a 5.42 ERA. He induced 82 walks while striking out 73 in 147.2 innings.

Detroit Tigers
In 2000, the Tigers signed Sparks to a minor league deal. He made four appearances with the team before getting demoted to AAA, he went 5–7 in 14 starts at the minor league level. He got called back up on July 22. He finished the season in the rotation, going 7–5.

In 2001, Sparks enjoyed the best season of his career, setting career highs in wins (14), ERA (3.65), innings (232), complete games (8) and strikeouts (116).

Sparks regressed the following year, going 8–16 in 30 starts for the Tigers and recording the highest ERA in the American League (5.52). Sparks was demoted to the bullpen in 2003 in favor of rookie pitcher Jeremy Bonderman. Sparks was let go after 42 games and signed with the Oakland A's 4 days later.

Oakland Athletics
Sparks latched on with the A's and pitched in 9 games. His record between the A's and Tigers was 0–6 in 51 games.

Arizona Diamondbacks
In 2004, the Diamondbacks signed Sparks to a 1-year deal. Sparks finished 3–7 in 29 games (18 starts).

San Diego Padres
On January 25, 2005, Sparks was signed to a minor league deal with the Padres. He was injured for most of the season, only appearing in 3 starts in AAA. He was let go at mid season.

Oakland Athletics (second stint)
Sparks signed a minor league deal with the A's, making 11 starts for the AAA level.

Houston Astros
After the 2005 season, he was signed by the Houston Astros to a minor league contract, but after being cut, he retired at age 40.

Personal life
Sparks lives in Houston and works as a color analyst for Houston Astros radio broadcasts.

See also

List of knuckleball pitchers

References

External links

1965 births
Living people
Anaheim Angels players
Arizona Diamondbacks players
Baseball players from Oklahoma
Detroit Tigers players
Houston Astros announcers
Knuckleball pitchers
Major League Baseball broadcasters
Major League Baseball pitchers
Milwaukee Brewers players
New Orleans Zephyrs players
Oakland Athletics players
Petroleros de Cabimas players
Portland Beavers players
Sacramento River Cats players
Sam Houston Bearkats baseball players
Sportspeople from Tulsa, Oklahoma
Toledo Mud Hens players
Beloit Brewers players
El Paso Diablos players
Helena Brewers players
Midland Angels players
Stockton Ports players
Vancouver Canadians players
American expatriate baseball players in Mexico